Beckley may refer to:

Places
United Kingdom
Beckley, East Sussex, England
Beckley, Hampshire, England
Beckley, Oxfordshire, England
Beckley Park, a stately home

United States
Beckley, Louisville, Kentucky
Beckley, West Virginia

Other uses
Beckley (surname)
Beckley Foundation, a UK-based thinktank